Lavant is an electoral ward of Chichester District, West Sussex, England and returns one member to sit on Chichester District Council.

Following a district boundary review, the former ward of Funtington was split and merged into Lavant in 2019. Part of the previous Lavant boundaries were also split into the new Goodwood ward.

Councillor

Election results

* Elected

References

External links
 Chichester District Council
 Election Maps

Wards of Chichester District